

Bortelsee is a reservoir in the municipality of Brig in the canton of Valais, Switzerland. Its dam was built in 1989.

See also
List of mountain lakes of Switzerland

External links
Swissdams: Bortelsee
Kraftwerk Bortel 

Lakes of Valais
Reservoirs in Switzerland